Tarawera may refer to several locations in the Bay of Plenty Region, New Zealand:
 Mount Tarawera, volcano that last erupted in 1886
 Lake Tarawera, largest lake near Mount Tarawera
 Tarawera (New Zealand electorate), parliamentary electorate from 1978 to 1996
 Tarawera River, flows from Lake Tarawera
 Tarawera Falls, on the Tarawera River